Lake Cadibarrawirracanna, informally known as Lake Cadi, is a salt lake located in the Australian state of South Australia in the locality of Anna Creek in the state's Far North region about  north-west of the state capital of Adelaide. 

Lake Cadibarrawirracanna, meaning the stars were dancing, is said to be the second longest official place name in Australia. In Arabana language, it is "Kardipirla warrakanha", where kardipirla is stars, warra- is dance, play, -ka is simple past tense, and -nha is a proper noun marker

The lake is the subject of a song named "Carra Barra Wirra Canna" written by Morva Cogan and which was recorded in the 1960s by the Australian singer and musician, Rolf Harris.

See also

 List of lakes of South Australia
 List of long place names

References

Cadibarrawirracanna
Far North (South Australia)